Mogens Engell Köie or Køie (1911 - 2000) was a Danish ecologist and botanist. He was the first professor of botanical ecology at the University of Copenhagen.

Some publications 
 1938. The soil vegetation of the Danish conifer plantations of its ecology. Kongelige Danske Videnskabernes Selskabs Skrifter – Naturvidenskabelig og Mathematisk Afdeling, 9.ª ed. vol. VII (2): 1-86
 1943. Tøj fra yngre Bronzealder fremstillet af Stor Nælde (Utrica dioeca L.). Aarbøger for nordisk Oldkyndighed og Historie
 . 1944. De jydske Egekrat og deres Flora. Biologiske Skrifter, Det Kongelige Danske Videnskabernes Selskab 3 (3). 210 pp.
 . 1951. Relations of vegetation, soil and subsoil in Denmark. Dansk Botanisk Arkiv 15 (5)
 --------, . 1954. Symbolae Afghanicae: enumeration and descriptions of the plants collected by L. Edelberg and M. Køie on "The 3rd Danish Expedition to Central Asia" and by W. Koelz, H.F. Neubauer, O.H. Volk, and others in Afghanistan. Biologiske Skrifter, Det Kongelige Danske Videnskabernes Selskab 8 (1)
 . 1955. Undersøgelser over ernæringen hos agerhøns, fasaner og urfugle i Danmark. Danske Vildtundersøgelser 4. Aarhus, 22 pp.

Honors

Eponyms 
 (Acanthaceae) Dicliptera koiei Leonard
 (Asteraceae) Cousinia koieana Bornm.
 (Lamiaceae) Nepeta koieana Rech.f.
 (Salicaceae) Salix × koiei Kimura

References

External links
 https://species.wikimedia.org/wiki/Mogens_Engell_K%C3%B6ie

Danish ecologists
20th-century Danish botanists
1911 births
2000 deaths